The Karayaka (Black Neck) is a breed of domestic sheep from Turkey.  It is a dual purpose breed producing meat and milk.  The wool is used in carpets.  The Karayaka is classified as a long thin-tailed breed.

Characteristics 
Usually, the Karayaka is white with black eyes, head and legs.  Infrequently, brown or black animals are seen.  Most of the time, rams are horned and ewes are polled (hornless).

Also, ewes weigh  and produce  of milk in a 130- to 140-day lactation period.

References 

Sheep breeds
Sheep breeds originating in Turkey